Amina Al Jassim or Amina Al-Jassim, is a Saudi Arabian fashion designer of haute couture and jellabiyas.

References

External links
 Official Website

Saudi Arabian fashion designers
Living people
Year of birth missing (living people)